Below is the list of asteroid close approaches to Earth in 2019.

Timeline of known close approaches less than one lunar distance from Earth 
A list of known near-Earth asteroid close approaches less than 1 lunar distance from Earth in 2019. 2019 has been a notable year in that an asteroid was detected prior to impact (2019 MO). This has only happened three times previously (see  List of successfully predicted asteroid impacts). In addition, for the first year ever, four close approaches of previously undiscovered asteroids were successfully predicted over a week in advance.

A number of known asteroids came closer than this in 2019, notably including 2019 MO which was detected a few hours before it impacted, only the fourth asteroid impact in history to have been successfully predicted in advance. While most asteroids on this list are confirmed, well-observed unconfirmed objects with a 50% or greater chance of passing within 1 LD of the Earth are included as well.

Warning Times by Size 
This sub-section visualises the warning times of the close approaches listed in the above table, depending on the size of the asteroid. The sizes of the charts show the relative sizes of the asteroids to scale. For comparison, the approximate size of a person is also shown. This is based the absolute magnitude of each asteroid, an approximate measure of size based on brightness.

Abs Magnitude 30 and greater
 (size of a person for comparison)

Abs Magnitude 29-30

Absolute Magnitude 28-29

Absolute Magnitude 27-28

Absolute Magnitude 26-27

Absolute Magnitude 25-26
 
Absolute Magnitude less than 25 (largest)

Notes

Timeline of close approaches less than one lunar distance from the Moon 
The number of asteroids listed here are significantly less than those of asteroids that approach Earth for several reasons. Asteroids that approach Earth not only move faster, but are brighter and are easier to detect with modern surveys because:
 Asteroids that come closer to Earth are a higher priority to confirm, and only confirmed asteroids are listed with a lunocentric approach distance.
 Those that closely approach the Moon are frequently lost in its glare, making them harder to confirm. They are similarly hard to discover during the new moon, when the Moon is too close to the Sun to detect asteroids while they are near the Moon.

These factors severely limit the amount of Moon-approaching asteroids, to a level many times lower than the asteroids detected passing as close to Earth.

Notes

Additional examples 

An example list of near-Earth asteroids that passed more than 1 lunar distance (384,400 km or 0.00256 AU) from Earth in 2019.

Notes

Virtual impactors
Listed are asteroids that are included on the Sentry Risk Table because they have short observation arcs with poorly constrained orbits and have a chance of striking Earth in 2019. Given a short observation arc, many different orbits fit the observed data. These objects could be millions if not billions of kilometers from Earth on the date of a low probability virtual impactor. For example,  is expected to be  from Earth in October 2019 around the time of the virtual impact.

Cumulatively among the asteroids listed below, there is a roughly 1 in 16,500 chance that any of the asteroids will impact Earth in 2019. Most of this comes from asteroid  which formerly had a 1 in 20,000 chance of impact on 9 September 2019, but the impact was ruled out in August.

Also included are asteroids discovered before impact and exceptionally massive fireballs with either an equivalent yield of more than 1 kiloton of TNT or an estimated size of more than 3 meters.

Notes

See also 
List of asteroid close approaches to Earth
List of asteroid close approaches to Earth in 2018
List of asteroid close approaches to Earth in 2020
List of bolides (asteroids and meteoroids that impacted Earth)
Asteroid impact prediction

References

External links 
Near-Earth object close approaches ±30 days within 5 LD (JPL)
Upcoming close approaches to Earth (ESA)
Table of Asteroids Next Closest Approaches to the Earth (Sormano Observatory)

close approaches to Earth in 2019
Near-Earth asteroids